Kent Gardens may refer to:

Kent Gardens Elementary School, McLean, Virginia, USA
Kent Gardens Park, McLean, Virginia, USA

See also
Kent, a town in England, referred to as the Garden town